In surveying, free stationing (also known as resection) is a method of determining a location of one unknown point in relation to known points. There is a zero point of reference called a total station. The instrument can be freely positioned so that all survey points are at a suitable sight from the instrument. Setting up the total station on a known point, often it is not possible to see all survey points. With the total station, bearings and distances are measured to at least two known points of a control network. This with a handheld computer recorded data is related to local polar coordinates, defined by the horizontal circle of the total station. By a geometric transformation, these polar coordinates are transformed to the coordinate system of the control network. Errors are distributed by least squares adjustment. The position and orientation of the total station in relation to where the control network is established.

Comparison of methods
 Angular resection and triangulation: only bearings are measured to the known points. 
 Trilateration: only distances are measured to the known points.
 Free stationing and triangulateration: both bearings and distances are measured to the known points.

Naming
Because bearings and distances are measured in a full resection (free stationing), the result may have a different mathematical solution. This method of a "total station set up" has different names in other languages, e.g. in German: Freie Standpunktwahl (free stationing).
Naming is also regulated by the German Institute for Standardization DIN 18 709.

Different mathematical solution

By measuring bearings and distances, local polar coordinates are recorded. The orientation of this local polar coordinate system is defined by the 0° horizontal circle of the total station (polar axis L). The pole of this local polar coordinate system is the vertical axis (pole O) of the total stations. The polar coordinates (r,f) with the pole are transformed with a surveying software in a data collector to the Cartesian coordinates (x,y) of the known points and the coordinates for the position of the total station are calculated.

In a resection (triangulation) measuring bearings only, there can be a problem with an infinite number of solutions called: "danger circle" or "inscribed angle theorem".

Back-sight points
The back-sight points of the control network should cover and surround the stationing site. The position of the total station is not part of the area. This is the area where you want to measure with this station setup. Topographic points or stakeout points should not be measured outside this area. If measured outside this area, the errors in orientation will be extrapolated instead of being interpolated.

While it is possible to use only two known control points in a resection (free stationing), it is recommended to use three control points. There is no redundancy for orientation, using two points only.

Using five or more points of the control network, there is only a slight improvement in the accuracy.

Advantages

 Choose the station point free for best visibility to all survey points
 Where there is no obstruction
 Where there is no traffic
 Where there is the highest safety for the observer and the instrument

Because of the range and accuracy of total stations, the method of a resection (free stationing) permits a great freedom of positioning the total station. For this reason, this method is one of the most used station set ups.

Application

With the calculated coordinates and orientation of the total station, it can be used to set out points in construction surveying, machine guidance, site plan or other types of surveys.

References

External links
 Topcon Magnet Field 1.0 Help
 Leica SmartWorx Viva Field Software  Datasheet  
 CarlsonSurvCE Reference Manual 
 12d Field – Helmert Resection 
 Trimble: Advantages and Disadvantages of the Stationing Programs 
 Trimble: Design of the Backsight Point Configuration
 Trimble: Problems in Resection Without Redundancy
 Trimble: The Influence of Weights in Resection
 Trimble: Neighborhood Adjustment

Surveying
Surveying instruments
Geodesy
Civil engineering